Wilmington Grammar School for Girls (WGSG), previously known as the Grammar School for Girls Wilmington, is a grammar school with academy status in Wilmington, Kent, England. The uniform consists of maroon blazers, maroon jumpers and skirts/black trousers, with blue shirts. The school is a member of the WHS partnership, so has a close relationship with the next-door Wilmington Grammar School for Boys, as well as Wilmington Academy and Oasis Academy Hextable.

History
The land was occupied by apple orchards in the 17th century. In the 18th century a workhouse was established before the Whitehead family took over the manor house on the site. There was a gardener with cottage still in the tennis grounds, a pigsty, sweeping carriageway, large greenhouses and many other noticeable features.

Departments
The school has the following departments: Science, Mathematics, Design/Technology, Business, Geography, History, English, Art, Modern Languages (including Spanish, French and Mandarin), Media, Information Communication Technology, Social Sciences, Religious Studies and Philosophy, PE and Music.

Buildings

The school is made up of several buildings. The Manor across the road is home to the English department, the practice music rooms, 6th form common rooms, a media studies room and a D.T. room. It still retains many traditional features, including the ceilings and fireplaces. The Grange is also an old manor house, with stained glass windows and original staircases and fireplaces. It is home to the library, study room and offices. In addition, there is the New Building, first built in the 1960s and extended in 2009 to host new maths, science and language rooms. This building has the majority of classrooms and computer suites. Finally, the Learning Centre is an ICT equipped building consisting of two classrooms with laptops and computers in, and opened in late 2004. In 2015 the Connell Wing was added, with meeting rooms, history rooms, a computer room, a large music room and storage cupboard, a large performing arts and drama floor, a practice room along with many other classrooms.

Facilities
The school has a hall, gymnasium, seven science labs (two of which are newly refurbished), seven ICT suites, three 6th form common rooms, a large study room, a music room, a library, four tennis courts, two leisure lawns and a long-jump pit.

Awards and achievements
 Ofsted outstanding school
 Awarded Specialist Status for Maths and Computing. (September 2004)
 County Beacon status for Mathematics and Modern Foreign Languages
 Oracle Academy
 44% of Year 8 students achieved an award in the UK Maths Challenge
 Year 8, Year 9 and Year 10 school netball teams were all placed in the top 3 of the Gravesham League.
 Fifteen students have reached international standard in canoeing, polo, Tennis and Triathlon.

Notes and references

External links
 Wilmington Grammar School for Girls website
 School's profile at schoolsfinder.gov.uk

Educational institutions established in 1957
Grammar schools in Kent
Girls' schools in Kent
1957 establishments in England
Academies in Kent